XBasic is a variant of the BASIC programming language that was developed in the late 1980s for the Motorola 88000 CPU and Unix by Max Reason. In the early 1990s it was ported to Windows and Linux, and since 1999 it has been available as open source software with its runtime library under the LGPL license.

It should not be confused with TI Extended BASIC, which is sometimes called XBasic or X Basic. Xbasic should also not be confused with the Xbasic language used in Alpha Software's Alpha Anywhere and Alpha Five products. Alpha Software has developed Xbasic as a proprietary language for its products. Alpha Software's Xbasic is not connected in any way at all to the version of Xbasic described in this article.

Max Reason discontinued his support, and development since has been overseen by Eddie Penninkhof. Eddie in the meantime has also discontinued support and same was taken over by a programmer 'CW', who brought especially the linux version more in line with recent developments.

Version 6.2.3 was the last official release, released on 27 October 2002, however unofficial releases are still being maintained by a group of enthusiasts via GitHub. (Just look for Max Reason's XBasic) There have been several updates to the Xbasic programming language for Windows and Linux since then.

We have now heard from Eddie Penninkhof and have successfully uploaded the latest versions of Xbasic to Source Forge. (xbasic-6.3.26-A-windows210724) (xbasic-6.3.26-A-Linux210724-tar-gz) . The latest versions are also available from the GitHub xbwlteam. In these releases Robin Warner has included the entire HTML (not updated) documentation, the updated Quick Reference guide, and software and examples of his Function Maps designed to assist programmers who want to change and recompile the programming language. YaHoo has shut down many (all unprofitable?) user groups including the Xbasic user group.

If you have questions, problems, or ideas about programming with Xbasic, check out the new Xbasic user group: (groups.io/g/MaxReasonsxBasic) We have several very experienced programmers who can help: We are looking for more programmers who would be interested helping maintain and update the program.

Characteristics 
XBasic has signed and unsigned 8-, 16- and 32-bit and signed 64-bit integers as well as 32- and 64-bit floating point values. The string data type is only for 8-bit characters.

It is possible to generate an assembly language file. XBasic has a Windows only version called XBLite. Development is at SourceForge.

Components
 Editor (writing source code)
 Compiler (creating machine code)
 Debugger (checking for errors)
 Libraries (ready made code to call on)
 GuiDesigner (creates the graphical user interface for the program)

Example code
 ' Programs contain:
 ' 1. A PROLOG with type/function/constant declarations.
 ' 2. This Entry() function where execution begins.
 ' 3. Zero or more additional functions.
 '
 FUNCTION Entry()

 PRINT "Hello World"

 PRINT 2+2
 PRINT 44/12
 PRINT 33*3

 END FUNCTION

References

External links 
https://groups.io/g/MaxReasonsxBasic
{https://github.com/orgs/xbwlteam/repositories}  

 documentation, links and resources
Making your first GUI Tutorial
Making a Standalone Executable
XBLite homepage
Category:XBasic Tasks implemented in XBasic on rosettacode.org

Articles with example BASIC code
BASIC compilers
Linux programming tools
Programming tools for Windows
BASIC programming language family